Joi Williams   (born November 5, 1966) is the former head coach of the  UCF Knights women's basketball team.

Career
Williams arrived at UCF in 2007 and during her tenure, she has taken the Knights to two C-USA championships. As of March 7, 2016, Williams and the school agreed to part ways. On March 14, 2017, Williams was announced as a new assistant coach for the WNBA's San Antonio Stars.

Personal life
In August 2004, she married Herman Felton Jr.

Head coaching record
Source

References

External links 
 Official Athletics Site
 Women's Basketball Site

1966 births
Living people
American women's basketball coaches
Basketball coaches from Florida
Basketball players from Jacksonville, Florida
Bishop Kenny High School alumni
Clemson Tigers women's basketball coaches
Florida Gators women's basketball coaches
Murray State Racers women's basketball coaches
Point guards
South Florida Bulls women's basketball players
Sportspeople from Jacksonville, Florida
UCF Knights women's basketball coaches